Arthropteris beckleri, commonly known as the Hairy Climbing Fishbone Fern, is a small rainforest fern of the genus Arthropteris native to eastern Australia. It is found north of Nowra, usually growing on rocks or from trees in areas of high altitude.

References 

Tectariaceae
Ferns of Australia
Flora of New South Wales
Flora of Queensland